Polytravellers is the debut studio album by American electronic musician Vektroid  released on May 12, 2011. The album was released as a prelude to the album Starcalc. The album has good reviews.

Track listing
Alternate titles

 Giza
 Polytravellers A
 Polytravellers B
 Prismatic
 Tesselation A
 Tesselation B
 Wildlife Diskette

References

2011 debut albums
Vektroid albums